State Route 227 (SR 227) is a  route that serves as a connection between the Etowah–DeKalb county line south of Crossville with U.S. Route 431 (US 431) at Guntersville in Marshall County.

Route description
The southern terminus of SR 227 is located at the Etowah–DeKalb county line to the southwest of Hendrixville. From Hendrixville, the route travels in a northwesterly direction en route to Crossville. From Crossville, it travels in a northerly direction to Geraldine where it again resumes its northwesterly track.

Upon entering Marshall County, it takes a more westerly route before turning towards the south en route to its northern terminus at US 431 in downtown Guntersville.

History
The southern terminus of SR 227 until approximately 1985 occurred on Meighan Boulevard in Gadsden, Alabama which is also US 278/US 431.  The routing ran northward passing near the Noccalula Falls Park then crossing I-59 (exit 188), followed by an intersection with US 11 near Reece City and continuing onto Crossville, Alabama. The route between Meighan Boulevard in Gadsden and US 11 in Reece City is now designated as SR 211. The remainder of the former route between US 11 and the Etowah–DeKalb county line is now an Etowah county road until the SR 227 designation begins at the county line.

Major intersections

References

External links

Alabama Department of Transportation county road maps for DeKalb & Marshall (Adobe Acrobat reader required for maps; enlargement of maps necessary for legibility)

227
Transportation in Etowah County, Alabama
Transportation in DeKalb County, Alabama
Transportation in Marshall County, Alabama